Rossolimo is a Greek last name. According to researches of Alexander N. Rossolimo, the name is widely used on the Ionian Islands and especially Kefalonia. It originates from the French baron or general Hugues de Sully who was in the service of Charles I of Naples. His red hair got de Sully the nickname Hugues le Rousseau that was mixed from Rousseau and Sully to the name Rossolimo.

Notable people 
 Grigory Ivanovich Rossolimo (1860–1928), Russian neurologist
 Nicolas Rossolimo (1910–1975), French and US chess player

See also 
 Rossolimo's sign
 Rossolimo variation in the Sicilian Defence, a chess opening.

Sources 
 Alain Pallier: Nicolas Rossolimo (28ii1910 – 24vii1975). In: eg 180, April 2010. Page 120, note 1
 Albert Failler: Revue des études Byzantines, Année 1993, Volume 51, Numéro 1, pages 317 - 319

Surnames